is a Japanese manga and anime series for young children by Atsuko Ueno. The anime was produced by NAS and TV Tokyo. Kotencotenko replaces the previous anime series: Onmyou Taisenki on the TV Tokyo Thursdays 06:00pm – 06:30pm slot.

Story
Kotencotenco is a gag strip anime for especially younger children. Featuring the flourishes of the Prince of Heaven Kingdom, Kotenco. It's up to him and his friends, Pick-chan and Nappa to stop The Baron, Urusainu, and Nekoumori from stealing the heavenly stars for their boss, The Great Demon King Agu, who wants to take over Heaven Kingdom. Kotenco is normally very kind, but will transform into Matenco, his trouble-making counterpart when in bad spirit. Matenco is transformed back into Kotenco when Pick-chan calls upon The Queen to replace Matenco's halo.

Characters

Heaven Kingdom
Kotenco - 
Matenco - 
The Queen - 
Mumu-san -

Kotenco's 6 older brothers
Dawn - 
Vah -  /  (Episode 22 only)
Sera
Kevi
Fanni
Ru -

Fairy Kingdom
Pick-chan(Pikku-chan) - 
Nappa - 
Elder(Choro) -

Ground Kingdom
The Baron - 
Nekoumori - 
Urusainu - 
Otaka-san - 
Kurikuri - 
Great Demon King Agu -

Database

Opening/Ending themes
Opening: "Issyo ni Utaou!(Let's sing!)" by Sae
Ending: "Hoshi-monogatari(Stories of the Stars)" by Kawai Eri
2nd Opening: "Yukeyuke Kotengo" by Tenkara-Mail
2nd Ending: "Kotenco Exercise"(Kotenko Taisou) by Tenkara-Mail

Episodes

Video game
A minigame collection called  was made by Dorasu for the Nintendo DS and released on 29 March 2007 in Japan.

CDs
3 CDs were released in 2005 and 2006. 2 featured the 1st and 2nd intros and outros, along with karaoke tracks. The 3rd CD was released as a soundtrack / drama CD, featuring background music from the anime, and 3 stories.

Traffic Safety OVA
A traffic safety OVA called  meant to teach young children about traffic safety, and was released before the anime's broadcast.

External links
TV Tokyo Kotencotenco Official Homepage
Animax's official Kotencotenco website
Official video game website
Kotencotenco on Jp Wikipedia

Children's manga
Kodansha manga
TV Tokyo original programming
Video games developed in Japan
Nintendo DS games